Blackmill is a small village in the south of Wales, UK.

Blackmill may also refer to:

Blackmill Games, a gaming company that co-developed Verdun
Blackmill Loch, a dammed reservoir in Argyll and Bute, Scotland
Blackmill Woodlands, an oak forest near the village of Blackmill in Wales

See also
Black Mill (disambiguation)
Blackmail (disambiguation)